Thomas James Davis (born May 21, 1973 in Mobile, Alabama) is a retired Major League Baseball catcher who played for the Baltimore Orioles in .

Career
Davis attended the University of Southern Mississippi. In 1993, he played collegiate summer baseball with the Wareham Gatemen of the Cape Cod Baseball League and was named a league all-star.

Davis was selected by the Baltimore Orioles in the 2nd round of the 1994 MLB Draft. He appeared in five career major league games for Baltimore in 1999.

References

External links

1973 births
Living people
Baseball players from Alabama
Baltimore Orioles players
Major League Baseball catchers
Southern Miss Golden Eagles baseball players
Wareham Gatemen players
All-American college baseball players
Sportspeople from Mobile, Alabama